Boys and Diamonds is the debut studio album by husband-and-wife electronica duo Rainbow Arabia. It was released on German electronic record label Kompakt on February 28, 2011, and on March 1, 2011 in the United States.

Critical reception
Boys and Diamonds received widely varying reviews from critics, ranging from an F from Consequence of Sound to an A− from Robert Christgau. Critics who gave the album negative reviews often criticized it for being derivative of world music, or for not living up to the potential of mixing it with electronic pop, as had been Rainbow Arabia's intention. Other critics, though, like Chris Power, praised the album in spite of its derivativeness, because of its memorable hooks, while Allmusic's Rick Anderson wrote that the album exhibited "a well-developed and highly personal sound that draws from any number of exotic musical cultures without depending too much on any one of them."

Track listing
 Boys and Diamonds
 Without You 
 Blind
 Nothin Gonna Be Undone
 Papai
 Jungle Bear
 Hai
 Mechanical
 This Life is Practice
 Sayer
 Sequenced

Personnel
Mark Chalecki– mastering
Mudrock– mixing, producer
Rainbow Arabia– engineer, primary artist, producer
Dylan Ryan– drums
Devin Troy Strother– artwork

References

2011 debut albums
Kompakt albums
Electronic albums by American artists